Kalika Singh (born 17 July 1911, date of death unknown) was an Indian politician. He was elected to the Lok Sabha, lower house of the Parliament of India from Azamgarh, Uttar Pradesh as a member of the Indian National Congress.

References

External links
Official biographical sketch in Parliament of India website

India MPs 1957–1962
Lok Sabha members from Uttar Pradesh
Indian National Congress politicians
1911 births
Year of death missing
Indian National Congress politicians from Uttar Pradesh